Sir John Hobart, 3rd Baronet (20 March 1628 – 22 August 1683) was an English landowner and politician who sat in the House of Commons at various times between 1654 and 1683.

Hobart was the son of Sir Miles Hobart (son of Sir Henry Hobart, 1st Baronet), and his wife Frances Peyton, daughter of Sir John Peyton, 1st Baronet, and was born in Ditchingham, Norfolk. He succeeded his uncle John as baronet in 1647.

In 1654, Hobart was elected member of parliament for Norfolk in the First Protectorate Parliament. He was re-elected MP for Norfolk in 1656 for the Second Protectorate Parliament.

After the Restoration Hobart was appointed Sheriff of Norfolk in 1667 and was host to King Charles II of England at Blickling in 1671. He was elected again as MP for Norfolk in the Cavalier Parliament from 1673 until February 1679 and from May of the same year until his death.

His cousin Philippa, daughter of his uncle John, was his first wife, whom he married in 1647. In June 1656, Hobart married secondly Mary Hampden, daughter of John Hampden at St Giles's-in-the-Fields in London. Hobart had one son by his first wife and four sons and two daughters by his second wife.

Hobart was buried in Blickling a week after his death and was succeeded by his eldest son Henry.

References

1628 births
1683 deaths
Baronets in the Baronetage of England
High Sheriffs of Norfolk
John
English MPs 1654–1655
English MPs 1656–1658
English MPs 1661–1679
English MPs 1679
English MPs 1680–1681
English MPs 1681
People from Blickling
People from Ditchingham
Members of Cromwell's Other House
Members of the Parliament of England for Norfolk